The Viscount of Jersey has, since the 14th century, been the chief executive officer of the Royal Court of Jersey. Since 1930, court services have been provided by the Viscount's Department in conjunction with the Judicial Greffe. Until 1973 the Viscount was appointed by the Crown; since 1973 Viscounts have been appointed by the Bailiff of Jersey.

The principal function of the Viscount (also referred to in Channel Island English by the Jersey Legal French title of the Vicomte) is the execution of the orders of the courts of Jersey. This involves managing fines, bail monies, seizures, confiscations, evictions, service of process, arrests for non-appearance in court and other enforcement procedures.

The Viscount manages jury selection and exemption, financial assistance to jury members and acts as surveillant for the jury.

The Viscount also acts as coroner to deal with matters relating to sudden or unexpected death, and administers estates of deceased persons.

In cases of insolvency, the Viscount administers en désastre proceedings.

The Viscount is amongst those who act as autorisé (returning officer) for elections in Jersey.

The Viscount acts as mace-bearer for the Bailiff of Jersey in the States of Jersey and the Royal Court of Jersey, and carries out other ceremonial functions.

History

The Viscount carried out other functions historically: till 1885 the Public Markets were under his control. He was Comptroller of Weights and Measures and a member of the Prison Board. He read aloud Royal Proclamations in the Royal Square. A notable action of the Viscount during the exile in Jersey of Charles, Prince of Wales, was the proclamation in the Royal Square of the Prince as King, following the execution of his father.

Until 1842 the Viscount was a member of the States of Jersey with a right to speak but not to vote. From 1842 until 1948 the Viscount sat as a member of the States without speaking or voting rights. The constitutional reform of 1948 removed the Viscount's membership of the legislature but the Viscount's Department continues to be represented at meetings of the States for the provision of executive services.

The Biographical Dictionary of Jersey by Balleine says: VISCOUNT. Vicomte. In ancient France a very high dignitary, the Vice-Count, who took the place of the Count or Duke, when absent. Later in Normandy a Viscount was appointed over each county, the Viscount of the Cotentin, the Viscount of the Avranchin, etc. A charter of 1179 shows the Viscount holding the King's Court in Guernsey. In time the dignity of the name was forgotten, and the Viscount became a mere Court official. By the 14th century the Viscount in Jersey was the chief executive officer of the Court, appointed by the Crown to see that orders of the Court were carried out, to issue summonses, to make arrests, to keep prisoners in custody, to abate nuisances, to deliver seisin 'by the Viscount's rod'. He also acted as Coroner, and till 1885 the Public Markets were under his control. He read aloud Royal Proclamations in the Royal Square, was Comptroller of Weights and Measures and a member of the Prison Board.

List

References

External links
Viscount's Department

Jersey-related lists
History of Jersey
Jersey law

nrm:Vicomte